Mount Arlington is a borough in Morris County, New Jersey, United States. As of the 2010 United States Census, the borough's population was 5,050, reflecting an increase of 387 (+8.3%) from the 4,663 counted in the 2000 Census, which had in turn increased by 1,033 (+28.5%) from the 3,630 counted in the 1990 Census. 

It is located on the southeast shore of Lake Hopatcong, New Jersey's largest lake and a major recreational resource.

History
While Mount Arlington is now mostly a suburban residential community, it was once a thriving resort community. In the era before the world wars and the advent of air travel, it was a welcome respite for the residents of nearby New York City and Newark.

Every summer, thousands would arrive by train at Landing Station, and then travel by water taxi across Lake Hopatcong to the area's many large resort hotels to escape the city heat and enjoy the famous "Mount Arlington breeze" which always cooled the summer evenings. There was also a major amusement park, Bertrand Island, which featured a world-famous carousel and roller coaster, which operated until the park was closed in 1983.

Mount Arlington was incorporated as a borough by an act of the New Jersey Legislature on November 3, 1890, from portions of Roxbury Township, based on the results of a referendum held two days earlier. Additional territory was acquired from Roxbury Township on July 25, 1891, on May 31, 1893, and on May 31, 1894. The borough is named for Henry Bennet, 1st Earl of Arlington.

In March 2014, members of the public petitioned the New Jersey Department of Community Affairs to form the Roxbury Mount Arlington Study Commission to consider a possible consolidation of Mount Arlington and the neighboring municipality of Roxbury Township. In March 2015, the commission was formed with five members and two alternates from each municipality. If the commission votes to recommend a merger, the decision would have to be ratified by a referendum of the voters in each community.

Geography
According to the United States Census Bureau, the borough had a total area of 2.79 square miles (7.23 km2), including 2.14 square miles (5.54 km2) of land and 0.65 square miles (1.68 km2) of water (23.30%).

The borough borders the municipalities of Jefferson Township, New Jersey and Roxbury Township in Morris County; and Hopatcong in Sussex County.

Demographics

Census 2010

The Census Bureau's 2006–2010 American Community Survey showed that (in 2010 inflation-adjusted dollars) median household income was $77,240 (with a margin of error of +/− $14,564) and the median family income was $93,780 (+/− $8,872). Males had a median income of $61,838 (+/− $16,955) versus $59,950 (+/− $11,428) for females. The per capita income for the borough was $43,226 (+/− $4,107). About none of families and 2.8% of the population were below the poverty line, including 2.9% of those under age 18 and 5.7% of those age 65 or over.

Census 2000
As of the 2000 United States Census there were 4,663 people, 1,918 households, and 1,262 families residing in the borough. The population density was 2,207.1 people per square mile (853.3/km2). There were 2,039 housing units at an average density of 965.1 per square mile (373.1/km2). The racial makeup of the borough was 91.42% White, 1.82% African American, 0.19% Native American, 3.82% Asian, 0.04% Pacific Islander, 1.27% from other races, and 1.44% from two or more races. Hispanic or Latino of any race were 4.55% of the population.

There were 1,918 households, out of which 28.3% had children under the age of 18 living with them, 54.5% were married couples living together, 8.7% had a female householder with no husband present, and 34.2% were non-families. 27.9% of all households were made up of individuals, and 6.2% had someone living alone who was 65 years of age or older. The average household size was 2.42 and the average family size was 2.99.

In the borough the population was spread out, with 22.1% under the age of 18, 5.3% from 18 to 24, 35.5% from 25 to 44, 26.5% from 45 to 64, and 10.6% who were 65 years of age or older. The median age was 38 years. For every 100 females, there were 90.6 males. For every 100 females age 18 and over, there were 87.1 males.

The median income for a household in the borough was $67,213, and the median income for a family was $79,514. Males had a median income of $53,049 versus $40,417 for females. The per capita income for the borough was $32,222. About 2.3% of families and 3.3% of the population were below the poverty line, including 5.3% of those under age 18 and 3.4% of those age 65 or over.

Government

Local government
Mount Arlington is governed under the Borough form of New Jersey municipal government, which is used in 218 municipalities (of the 564) statewide, making it the most common form of government in New Jersey.  The governing body is the Mayor and the Borough Council, with all positions elected at-large on a partisan basis as part of the November general election. The Mayor is elected directly by the voters to a four-year term of office. The Borough Council has six members, elected to serve three-year terms on a staggered basis, with two seats coming up for election each year in a three-year cycle. The Borough form of government used by Mount Arlington is a "weak mayor / strong council" government in which council members act as the legislative body with the mayor presiding at meetings and voting only in the event of a tie. The mayor can veto ordinances subject to an override by a two-thirds majority vote of the council. The mayor makes committee and liaison assignments for council members, and most appointments are made by the mayor with the advice and consent of the council.

, the Mayor of Mount Arlington is Republican Michael Stanzilis, who is serving a term of office ending December 31, 2022. In April 2016, Stanzilis was selected by the Borough Council from three names nominated by the Republican municipal committee to fill the seat following the death of Arthur R. Ondish; Stanzilis served on an interim basis until the November 2016 general election when he was elected to serve the two years remaining on the term of office. Members of the Borough Council are Council President Jack Delaney (R, 2023), Andrew Cangiano (R, 2022), Maria Farris (R, 2024), Melissa Fostle (R, 2023), Nita Galate (R, 2024) and Leonard J. "Lee" Loughridge Jr. (R, 2022).

In January 2020, the Borough Council appointed Melissa Fostle to fill the seat expiring in December 2020 that became vacant when Steve Sadow resigned to move out of the borough.

In the November 2019 general election, Republicans Maria Farris and Debra Galate were elected to fill the seats expiring in December 2021 that had been held by Raymond Simard and Robert Sorge.

In May 2016, the Borough Council appointed Jack Delaney to fill the council seat expiring in December 2017 that had been held by Michael Stanzilis until he was appointed as interim mayor; Delaney served on an interim basis until the November 2016 general election, when he was elected to serve the balance of the term of office.

Dover serves as the lead agency operating a joint municipal court that includes Mount Arlington and the neighboring municipalities of Mine Hill Township, Victory Gardens and Wharton. Established in 2009, the joint municipal court was forecast to offer annual savings in excess of $250,000 over the 10-year life of the agreement.

Federal, state and county representation
Mount Arlington is located in the 7th Congressional District and is part of New Jersey's 25th state legislative district.

 

Morris County is governed by a Board of County Commissioners comprised of seven members who are elected at-large in partisan elections to three-year terms on a staggered basis, with either one or three seats up for election each year as part of the November general election. Actual day-to-day operation of departments is supervised by County Administrator, John Bonanni. , Morris County's Commissioners are
Commissioner Director Tayfun Selen (R, Chatham Township, term as commissioner ends December 31, 2023; term as director ends 2022),
Commissioner Deputy Director John Krickus (R, Washington Township, term as commissioner ends 2024; term as deputy director ends 2022),
Douglas Cabana (R, Boonton Township, 2022), 
Kathryn A. DeFillippo (R, Roxbury, 2022),
Thomas J. Mastrangelo (R, Montville, 2022),
Stephen H. Shaw (R, Mountain Lakes, 2024) and
Deborah Smith (R, Denville, 2024).
The county's constitutional officers are the County Clerk and County Surrogate (both elected for five-year terms of office) and the County Sheriff (elected for a three-year term). , they are 
County Clerk Ann F. Grossi (R, Parsippany–Troy Hills, 2023),
Sheriff James M. Gannon (R, Boonton Township, 2022) and
Surrogate Heather Darling (R, Roxbury, 2024).

Politics
As of March 23, 2011, there were a total of 3,687 registered voters in Mount Arlington, of which 726 (19.7%) were registered as Democrats, 1,448 (39.3%) were registered as Republicans and 1,511 (41.0%) were registered as Unaffiliated. There were 2 voters registered as either Libertarians or Greens.

In the 2012 presidential election, Republican Mitt Romney received 58.0% of the vote (1,457 cast), ahead of Democrat Barack Obama with 41.2% (1,036 votes), and other candidates with 0.8% (20 votes), among the 2,525 ballots cast by the borough's 3,904 registered voters (12 ballots were spoiled), for a turnout of 64.7%. In the 2008 presidential election, Republican John McCain received 56.6% of the vote (1,535 cast), ahead of Democrat Barack Obama with 41.4% (1,123 votes) and other candidates with 1.0% (28 votes), among the 2,714 ballots cast by the borough's 3,695 registered voters, for a turnout of 73.5%. In the 2004 presidential election, Republican George W. Bush received 59.9% of the vote (1,456 ballots cast), outpolling Democrat John Kerry with 39.1% (951 votes) and other candidates with 0.5% (16 votes), among the 2,432 ballots cast by the borough's 3,396 registered voters, for a turnout percentage of 71.6.

In the 2013 gubernatorial election, Republican Chris Christie received 71.8% of the vote (1,177 cast), ahead of Democrat Barbara Buono with 26.2% (430 votes), and other candidates with 2.0% (32 votes), among the 1,664 ballots cast by the borough's 3,790 registered voters (25 ballots were spoiled), for a turnout of 43.9%. In the 2009 gubernatorial election, Republican Chris Christie received 62.5% of the vote (1,130 ballots cast), ahead of  Democrat Jon Corzine with 28.3% (512 votes), Independent Chris Daggett with 7.5% (136 votes) and other candidates with 0.8% (15 votes), among the 1,808 ballots cast by the borough's 3,679 registered voters, yielding a 49.1% turnout.

Education
The Mount Arlington School District serves public school students in kindergarten through eighth grade. As of the 2018–19 school year, the district, comprised of two schools, had an enrollment of 362 students and 35.9 classroom teachers (on an FTE basis), for a student–teacher ratio of 10.1:1. Schools in the district (with 2018–19 enrollment from the National Center for Education Statistics) are 
Edith M. Decker School with 111 students in Kindergarten through grade 2 (including a pre-school disabilities program) and 
Mount Arlington Public School with 249 students in grades 3–8. Both schools are located along the eastern bank of Lake Hopatcong.

For ninth through twelfth grades, public school students attend Roxbury High School in Roxbury Township, as part of a sending/receiving relationship with the Roxbury School District. As of the 2018–2019 school year, the high school had an enrollment of 1,297 students and 125.9 classroom teachers (on an FTE basis), for a student–teacher ratio of 10.3:1.

Transportation

Roads and highways

Interstate 80 is the main highway serving Mount Arlington, running for nearly  through the borough. One interchange, Exit 30, is located within Mount Arlington.

Public transportation
NJ Transit provides service at the Mount Arlington station on the Morristown Line and the Montclair-Boonton Line to Newark Broad Street Station, Hoboken Terminal, Secaucus Junction and New York Penn Station in Midtown Manhattan via Midtown Direct service.

Lakeland Bus Lines provides service along Interstate 80 operating between Newton and the Port Authority Bus Terminal in Midtown Manhattan.

Notable people

People who were born in, residents of, or otherwise closely associated with Mount Arlington include:

 Larry Arico (born 1969), former head college football coach for the Fairleigh Dickinson University–Florham Devils and William Paterson University Pioneers football programs
 Lotta Crabtree (1847–1924), actress
 Cortlandt V.R. Schuyler (1900–1993), United States Army four-star general who served as Chief of Staff, Supreme Headquarters Allied Powers Europe (COFS SHAPE) from 1953 to 1959
 Harry L. Sears (1920–2002), politician who served for 10 years in the New Jersey Legislature, and was indicted on charges of bribery and conspiracy after delivering $200,000 from financier Robert Vesco to Richard Nixon's 1972 presidential campaign

References

External links

 Mount Arlington web site
 Mount Arlington School District
 
 School Data for the Mount Arlington School District, National Center for Education Statistics
 Regional area newspaper
 Save the Mt. Arlington Police web site

 
1890 establishments in New Jersey
Borough form of New Jersey government
Boroughs in Morris County, New Jersey
Populated places established in 1890